Otis Munroe Hitchings (1822–1894) was an American shoe manufacturer and politician who served one term in the Massachusetts House of Representatives.

Hitchings was born on August 8, 1822, in Saugus, Massachusetts. His father, Benjamin Hitchings, was a shoe manufacturer and Otis and his brother John B. eventually joined their father as partners. From 1846 to 1872, Hitchings ran his own company, which employed as many as 100 employees. In 1876 he represented the 20th Essex District in the Massachusetts House of Representatives.

References

1822 births
1894 deaths
American manufacturing businesspeople
Democratic Party members of the Massachusetts House of Representatives
People from Saugus, Massachusetts